Dingaanstat is the 'stat' or village of Dingaan (Dingane, Udingane). The village is known to the Zulu as Umgungundlovu, and was under Zulu rule from 1795 until 1840. Now a mission station of the Dutch Reformed Church, it is situated between Melmoth and Babanango.

References

External links
 

Populated places in the Ulundi Local Municipality
Christian missions in South Africa